NBA Jam (sometimes "Jam" for short) is a long-running basketball video game series based on the National Basketball Association (NBA). Initially developed as arcade games by Midway, the game found popularity with its photorealistic digitized graphics, over-the-top presentation and exaggerated style of two-on-two basketball play. The successor to Midway's Arch Rivals, the original 1993 NBA Jam allowed players to jump many times above their own height, make slam dunks that defy human capabilities, and freely shove or elbow opponents out of the way without consequences. It also featured a variety of secret characters, as well as the ability to track player records and statistics between play sessions.

After the release of NBA Jam Tournament Edition, Acclaim, the publishers of the home versions of the Jam games acquired exclusive rights to release games under the NBA Jam name under their Acclaim Sports brand. They produced their own games with the NBA Jam name starting in 1996 with NBA Jam Extreme, an arcade game featuring the trademark over-the-top style of the previous games. Meanwhile, Midway continued its own series of NBA games with NBA Hangtime. After NBA Jam Extreme, Acclaim started publishing titles exclusive to home consoles with a more realistic style. Acclaim then attempted to return the series to its arcade roots with one more console game, 2003's NBA Jam, before the company closed in 2004.

6 years later, Electronic Arts acquired the rights to the name and in 2010 released NBA Jam for the Wii, PlayStation 3 and Xbox 360. The game was an attempt to replicate the original Midway games on newer consoles and original lead designer/programmer Mark Turmell was consulted on its development.

Installments
Midway NBA series

Non-Midway NBA Jam series

Reception
In 1996, Next Generation listed the NBA Jam series as number 99 on its "Top 100 Games of All Time", commenting that, "NBA Jam is still a terrific game, especially in the arcade with four players. Many of its innovations are now cliche, but it remains one of the best arcade machines around."

References

External links
 NBA Jam on Electronic Arts website
 NBA Jam reviewed on IGN Entertainment website - Release Date: October 22, 2010

NBA Jam
Video game franchises introduced in 1993